Two historic sites within the St. Aloysius Cemetery near Strasburg, North Dakota, United States, identified as St. Aloysius Cemetery, Wrought-Iron Cross Site A and St. Aloysius Cemetery, Wrought-Iron Cross Site B were listed on the National Register of Historic Places in 1989. They include wrought-iron crosses. The listing for Site A included 22 contributing objects.  The listing for Site B includes just one contributing object, which is work by Simon Marquardt.

Simon Marquardt, of Zeeland, North Dakota, was one of a number of "German-Russian blacksmiths in central North Dakota [who] developed their own cross styles and [whose] work was known for miles around them."

References

Cemeteries on the National Register of Historic Places in North Dakota
Cemeteries in Emmons County, North Dakota
German-Russian culture in North Dakota
National Register of Historic Places in Emmons County, North Dakota